FC Diana Volzhsk was a Russian football team from Volzhsk. It played professionally from 1998 to 2002. Their best result was 6th place in the Zone Povolzhye of the Russian Second Division in 1998 and 1999.

External links
  Team history at KLISF

Association football clubs established in 1993
Association football clubs disestablished in 2003
Defunct football clubs in Russia
Sport in Mari El
1993 establishments in Russia
2003 disestablishments in Russia